The 1968 Air Canada Silver Broom, the men's world curling championship, was held in Pointe-Claire, Quebec, Canada at the Pointe Claire Arena.

Teams

*Throws second stones.
**Throws third stones.

Standings

Results

Draw 1

Draw 2

Draw 3

Draw 4

Draw 5

Draw 6

Draw 7

Playoffs

Brackets

Semifinals

Final

References

External links
 WCF Statistics

World Men's Curling Championship
Air Canada Silver Broom, 1968
Pointe-Claire
Curling competitions in Montreal
1968 in Quebec
International curling competitions hosted by Canada
1960s in Montreal